Dana Krumbiegel (born 22 November 1969) is a German former footballer who played as a forward, appearing for the East Germany women's national team in their first and only match on 9 May 1990.

Career statistics

International

References

External links
 

1969 births
Living people
German women's footballers
East German women's footballers
East Germany women's international footballers
Women's association football forwards